is a train station on the Osaka Metro Tanimachi Line located in Higashisumiyoshi-ku, Osaka, Japan.

Layout
There is an island platform with two tracks on the second basement.

External links

 Official Site 
 Official Site 

Higashisumiyoshi-ku, Osaka
Osaka Metro stations
Railway stations in Japan opened in 1980